The 2006 Maine Black Bears football team was an American football team that represented the University of Maine as a member of the Atlantic 10 Conference during the 2006 NCAA Division I FCS football season. In their 14th season under head coach Jack Cosgrove, the Black Bears compiled a 6–5 record (5–3 against conference opponents) and tied for second in the Atlantic 10's North Division. Mike DeVito, Matt King, and Ron Whitcomb were the team captains.

Schedule

References

Maine
Maine Black Bears football seasons
Maine Black Bears football